Huxtable is a surname. Notable people with the surname include:

People 

 Henry Huxtable, a Bishop of Mauritius
 Ada Louise Huxtable, nee Landman  (1921–2013) American architecture critic
 Charles Huxtable (1891–1980) Australian doctor
 Charles Huxtable (British Army officer) (1931–2018), senior British Army officer
 Dave Huxtable, American football coach
 Dick Huxtable Welsh international rugby player
 Eric Huxtable, Australian footballer
 Judy Huxtable, British actress
 Juliana Huxtable, American artist
 Rebecca Huxtable, British radio personality
 Richard Huxtable, British medical ethicist
 Rosemary Huxtable, Australian civil servant

Fictional characters 

 The Huxtable family of The Cosby Show; see List of The Cosby Show characters#Main characters
 Millicent Huxtable, a character in One Tree Hill; see List of One Tree Hill characters#Main characters

English-language surnames